Milena Miconi (born 15 December 1971) is an Italian actress and former model.

She is an advocate for ', an organization for children suffering from muscular dystrophy.

Filmography

Film 

 Finalmente soli, direction Umberto Marino (1997)
 Fuochi d'artificio, direction Leonardo Pieraccioni (1997)
 Il sottile fascino del peccato, direction Franco Salvia (2010)
 Divino, (Short) direction Giovanni Bufalini (2011)
 La strada di Paolo, direction Salvatore Nocita (2011)
 Miss Wolf and the Lamb, (corto) direction Roberto Leoni (2011)
 100 metri dal paradiso, direction Raffaele Verzillo (2012)
 Il disordine del cuore, direction Edoardo Margheriti (2013)
 Babbo Natale non viene da Nord, direction Maurizio Casagrande (2015)

Television 

 1997 – Un posto al sole;
 1998 – S.P.Q.R., direction Claudio Risi;
 1999 – Anni '50, direction Carlo Vanzina;
 1999 – Don Matteo, direction Enrico Oldoini – episode Il fuoco della passione;
 2000 – Tequila & Bonetti – episode Crimini d'estate;
 2000 – La casa delle beffe, direction Pier Francesco Pingitore;
 2003–2004 – Carabinieri 2-3, direction Raffaele Mertes;
 2004 – Don Matteo 4, direction Giulio Base and Andrea Barzini;
 2005 – Edda, direction Giorgio Capitani;
 2005 – San Pietro, direction Giulio Base;
 2005 – Una famiglia in giallo, direction Alberto Simone;
 2005–2006 – Don Matteo 5, direction Giulio Base, Carmine Elia, Elisabetta Marchetti;
 2007 – Gente di mare 2, direction Giorgio Serafini – episode Una vita da salvare;
 2008 – Vita da paparazzo, direction Pier Francesco Pingitore;
 2008 – Terapia d'urgenza, direction Carmine Elia, Lucio Gaudino and Gianpaolo Tescari;
 2009 – Il Commissario Manara, direction Luca Ribuoli, Guido Caprino and Roberta Giarrusso;
 2011 – Il delitto di Via Poma, direction Roberto Faenza;
  2011 – Sarò sempre tuo padre, direction Lodovico Gasparini;
 2012 – La vita che corre, direction Fabrizio Costa;
 2012 – Inspector Rex – episode Gioco sottobanco;
 2013 – Un medico in famiglia 8 – Fiction TV.

References

External links 

1971 births
Living people
Actresses from Rome
Italian television actresses
Italian film actresses
Italian stage actresses
20th-century Italian actresses
21st-century Italian actresses